Toussaint-Eugène-Ernest Mocker (16 July 1811 – 3 October 1895) was a French opera singer and stage director. In his 30-year career as a principal singer at the Théâtre Impérial de l'Opéra-Comique he created numerous roles in the company's world premieres and from 1860 served as a stage director there. In his later years he was a singing teacher at the Conservatoire de Paris.

Roles created

Roles created by Mocker at the Opéra-Comique include:
Lelio in Montfort's Polichinelle (1839)
Albert in Clapisson's La symphonie, ou Maître Albert (1839)
Comte d'Elvas in Adam's La reine d'un jour (1839)
Charles VI in Auber's Zanetta (1840)
Don Sébastien d'Aveyro in Auber's Les diamants de la couronne (1841)
Tracolin in Adams's Le toréador (1849)
Danilowitch in Meyerbeer's L'étoile du nord (1854)
Chevalier de Boisrobert in Halévy's Valentine d'Aubigny (1856)

References

External links

1811 births
1895 deaths
Musicians from Lyon
French operatic tenors
19th-century French male opera singers
Academic staff of the Conservatoire de Paris
Voice teachers